Talgarth Festival of the Black Mountains is an annual event which takes place in the small market town of Talgarth in Mid Wales.

It is a celebration of an ancient town in a modern world with events including crafts, food, live and classical music, fireworks, dog show, continental market, literature, countryside exhibits and much more. It takes place over the August Bank holiday weekend.

The festival is organised and run by around 20 volunteers who meet once a month throughout the year.

The festival continues to grow in size and popularity and 2009 marked its 14th anniversary.

External links

Festivals in Wales
Talgarth